Béla vitéz Imrédy de Ómoravicza (29 December 1891 in Budapest – 28 February 1946 in Budapest) was Prime Minister of Hungary from 1938 to 1939.

Born in Budapest to a Catholic family, Imrédy studied law as a young man before he started working for the Hungarian Ministry of Finance.  Eventually becoming a skilled economist and financier, Imrédy was made Director of the Hungarian National Bank in 1928.  In 1932, he was appointed Minister of Finance under the fascist Prime Minister Gyula Gömbös.  After resigning in 1935, Imrédy became President of the Hungarian National Bank.  Extremely ambitious, Imrédy was known to hold right wing views on matters of domestic and social policy.  On matters of foreign policy, Imrédy was pro-British, a sentiment which was to help him gain the position of Minister of Economic Coordination under Prime Minister Kálmán Darányi.  When Darányi resigned in May 1938, Imrédy was appointed prime minister by Regent Miklós Horthy.  Imrédy's attempts to improve Hungary's diplomatic relations with Britain initially made him very unpopular with Germany and Italy.  Imrédy realized that he could not afford to alienate the two fascist powers on a long term basis, however, and from the autumn of 1938 onward his foreign policy became increasingly pro-German and pro-Italian.  Imrédy also worked to gain a base of power in Hungarian right wing politics, founding the Movement of Hungarian Life.  He was quick to suppress any rivals in his quest for power, and influential fascists such as Ferenc Szálasi were harassed by Imrédy's administration.  As Imrédy drifted further to the right, he proposed that the government be reorganized along totalitarian lines and enacted legislation that restricted the freedom of the press and caused many Jews to suffer economically.

In February 1939, Imrédy's moderate political opponents, angered at his growing compliancy to Germany and Hungary's right wing, presented evidence to Regent Horthy that suggested Imrédy's great-grandfather was Jewish.  When Horthy confronted Imrédy with the evidence, Imrédy could not deny the claims about his heritage and resigned the premiership on 13 February 1939.  Imrédy served in the Hungarian Army for a time in 1940, and in October of that year he founded the pro-fascist, Anti-Semitic Party of Hungarian Renewal.  When German troops occupied Hungary in 1944, Imrédy was German Plenipotentiary Edmund Veesenmayer’s top choice to replace Miklós Kállay as prime minister.  Horthy could not be swayed to accept the idea, however, and Döme Sztójay was made prime minister instead.  Imrédy became Sztójay's Minister of Economic Coordination in May 1944, but he was forced to resign in August.  After German forces were driven out of Hungary, Imrédy was arrested and tried by a People's Tribunal in November 1945.  Found guilty of war crimes and collaboration with the Nazis, he was sentenced to death and executed by a firing squad in the courtyard of the jail in Markó street, Budapest, in 1946.

References 

 Magyar életrajzi lexikon
 Életrajz SZTE Egyetemi Könyvtár Hadtörténeti gyűjtemény
 Az ezenanapon.hu összefoglalója
 Az Imrédy-kormány belpolitikája
 Az Imrédy-kormány külpolitikája
 Fotó Imrédy Béláról A kivégzés előtti percekben
 (Pincus Lauder) Markó Gergely: Imrédy Béla
 Imrédy Béla csodás forradalma mult-kor.hu

External links
 

1891 births
1946 deaths
Politicians from Budapest
Executed prime ministers
Hungarian fascists
Hungarian Nazis
Hungarian nobility
Prime Ministers of Hungary
Foreign ministers of Hungary
Finance ministers of Hungary
Governors of the Hungarian National Bank
Hungarian people of World War II
Hungarian people of Jewish descent
Executed Hungarian collaborators with Nazi Germany
People executed by Hungary by firing squad
Hungarian anti-communists
Heads of government convicted of war crimes
Heads of government who were later imprisoned
Unity Party (Hungary) politicians